Cabello is a Spanish and Italian surname. Notable people with the surname include:

Alba Cabello (born 1986), Spanish synchronized swimmer
Camila Cabello (born 1997), Cuban-American singer
Diosdado Cabello (born 1963), Venezuelan politician
Francisco Cabello (born 1969), Spanish professional road bicycle racer 
Francisco Cabello (born 1972), Argentine professional tennis player
Victoria Cabello (born 1975), Italian television presenter

See also
Cabello, a genus of spiders
Cabella (surname)

Italian-language surnames
Spanish-language surnames